Polyboea is a genus of Asian nursery web spiders that was first described by Tamerlan Thorell in 1895.  it contains only two species, found only in Asia: P. vulpina and P. zonaformis.

See also
 List of Pisauridae species

References

Araneomorphae genera
Pisauridae
Spiders of Asia
Taxa named by Tamerlan Thorell